Tzwetta Tzatschewa (27 December 1900 – 12 December 1975), also known as Manja Tzatschewa, was a Bulgarian film actress of the silent era.

Selected filmography
 The Devil (1918)
 Love (1919)
 The Japanese Woman (1919)
 Hate (1920)
 The Pearl of the Orient (1921)
 Sons of the Night (1921)
 The Shadow of Gaby Leed (1921)
 Peter Voss, Thief of Millions (1921)
 Marizza (1922)
 The Monk from Santarem (1924)
 Letters Which Never Reached Him (1925)
 Annemarie and Her Cavalryman (1926)
 The Tragedy of a Lost Soul (1927)

References

External links

1900 births
1975 deaths
Bulgarian film actresses
Bulgarian silent film actresses